Always Got Tonight is the eighth studio album by Chris Isaak. It was released in 2002 on WEA/Warner Bros. Records.

Track listing
All tracks composed by Chris Isaak; except where indicated
 "One Day"
 "Let Me Down Easy"
 "Worked It Out Wrong"
 "Courthouse"
 "Life Will Go On"
 "Always Got Tonight"
 "Cool Love" (Isaak, John Shanks)
 "Notice the Ring"
 "I See You Everywhere"
 "American Boy"
 "Somebody to Love"
 "Nothing to Say"

Personnel
Chris Isaak - vocals, guitar
Hershel Yatovitz - guitar
Rowland Salley - bass
Kenney Dale Johnson - drums
with:
Abraham Laboriel, Jamie Muhoberac, Jimmy Pugh, John Shanks, Lenny Castro, Matt Eakle, Patrick Warren, Paul Bushnell, Steve Ferrone - additional musicians
Millie Seeboth, Minnie Driver - backing vocals
Patrick Warren - string arrangement on "Cool Love"

Sales

References

Chris Isaak albums
2002 albums
Albums produced by John Shanks
Warner Records albums